Gina Coladangelo is a British businesswoman, lobbyist, and a former non-executive director at the Department of Health and Social Care. Images of Coladangelo and then Secretary of State for Health and Social Care, Matt Hancock kissing and embracing, at a time when social distancing restrictions were in place due to the COVID-19 pandemic in the United Kingdom, led to Hancock's resignation as Health Secretary in June 2021.

Early life and family 
Coladangelo was born in Hitchin Maternity Hospital, Hertfordshire. Her father, Rino C. Coladangelo, is a "multi-millionaire" businessman. Her mother is Heather Burtt. Her father came to the UK when he was aged 5, to Bedfordshire.

Gina Coladangelo studied Philosophy, Politics and Economics (PPE) at Oxford University from 1995 to 1998, and obtained a Master's degree from Oriel College. She worked as a newsreader at the student radio station, Oxygen 107.9 FM, where Matt Hancock was a sports reporter.

Her brother, Roberto Coladangelo, is a director of Partnering Health Limited (PHL), which won a £28m NHS contract, and although there is "no suggestion of any wrongdoing" on the part of PHL, "Hancock was found to have breached the Ministerial Code by failing to declare a stake in a family company that won an NHS contract."

Career
Coladangelo worked as a senior account manager in the campaigns division at Munro and Forster Communications before moving to the public relations and lobbying firm Luther Pendragon in 2002. She was promoted to partner in April 2005. With three other partners (Simon Whale, Amy Kroviak and Daniel Guthrie), she led a management buyout of the firm in December 2005 with the help of a £2,000,000 investment from Octopus Asset Management, a private equity firm. She therefore become a director and shareholder. She ceased to be employed by Luther Pendragon in 2014 and resigned as a director in 2017, though as of 2021 remains a shareholder. As of late June 2021, she had been the marketing and communications director since 2014 at the Oliver Bonas retail chain, which was founded by her husband Oliver Tress.

In June 2019 she received a parliamentary pass as a member of Hancock's staff. In March 2020 she was given a part-time role as a non-executive director at the Department of Health and Social Care (DHSC). She was paid £15,000, equivalent to £1,000 a day, for her directorship on a six-month contract, although there was no public record of the appointment. As an aide to Hancock, she accompanied him to confidential meetings with civil servants. In June 2021, it was reported that she resigned after her affair with Hancock was exposed.

Personal life
Coladangelo is the great-niece of former Arsenal goalkeeper Bob Wilson, and married Glynn Gibb, a London property lawyer, in 2004.

In 2009, she married Oliver Tress, the owner of Oliver Bonas, with whom she has three children. In 2015, they moved from Clapham Junction in London to a five-bedroom house in Wandsworth in London, with a live-in nanny.

Matt Hancock
Coladangelo and Matt Hancock have been friends since studying together at Oxford University in the 1990s. On 6 May 2021, Coladangelo was pictured kissing and in an embrace with Hancock, who at the time was serving as the Secretary of State for Health and Social Care. On 25 June 2021 The Sun published closed-circuit television footage of the encounter, which occurred at a time when social distancing restrictions were in place due to the COVID-19 pandemic in the United Kingdom. The Sun also said the pair were having an extramarital affair. Following the affair being made public, Coladangelo resigned from her position at the DHSC and it was reported that Coladangelo and Hancock separated from their spouses to move in together.

See also 
 COVID-19 contracts in the United Kingdom

References

Living people
1977 births
Alumni of Oriel College, Oxford
British lobbyists
21st-century English businesswomen
21st-century English businesspeople
English people of Italian descent
People from Hitchin
People from South Cambridgeshire District
Matt Hancock